Nematanthus is a genus of flowering plants in the family Gesneriaceae.  All of its species are endemic to Brazil. Compared to other gesneriads, Nematanthus has leaves that are small, succulent, and hard-surfaced.  The plant has a trailing, branching, and spreading habit; it is generally an epiphyte in nature and a hanging-basket plant in cultivation. The flower has fused petals. In some species, the flower has a "pouch" at the bottom. The fancied resemblance of such flowers to a goldfish gives these plants the common name goldfish plant or guppy plant.

Hummingbirds will often feed from the nectar-filled "goldfish" flowers.

Description
Nematanthus species are perennials or subshrubs, typically growing epiphytically, less often in humus-filled pockets on rocks. Their leaves are often reddish underneath. Their flowers have fused petals and vary quite widely in shape. Some have flowers with a "pouch" on the lower surface of the flower and a small opening (particularly those commonly cultivated). Others have flowers that are twisted through 180° when fully open (resupinate), so that if pouched, the pouch is at the top. Resupinate flowers may be brightly coloured, funnel-shaped and compressed from side to side, or white and bell-shaped. Some species have flowers that are borne on long pedicels and hang down below the plant, others have short pedicels so that the flowers are close to the stem.

Taxonomy
The genus Nematanthus was first described by Heinrich Adolph Schrader in 1821, with the only species (and so the type species) being Nematanthus corticola, one of the species with flowers hanging down on long pedicels.

Nematanthus is placed in the subfamily Gesnerioideae, tribe Gesnerieae, subtribe Columneinae. Within the subtribe, it forms a clade with Codonanthe, Codonanthopsis and Lesia:

Species
, Plants of the World Online accepted the following species:

Nematanthus albus Chautems
Nematanthus australis Chautems
Nematanthus bradei (Handro) Chautems
Nematanthus brasiliensis (Vell.) Chautems
Nematanthus corticola Schrad.
Nematanthus crassifolius (Schott) Wiehler
Nematanthus exsertus Chautems
Nematanthus fissus (Vell.) L.E.Skog
Nematanthus fluminensis (Vell.) Fritsch
Nematanthus fornix (Vell.) Chautems
Nematanthus fritschii Hoehne
Nematanthus gregarius D.L.Denham
Nematanthus hirtellus (Schott) Wiehler
Nematanthus jolyanus (Handro) Chautems
Nematanthus kautskyi Chautems & Rossini
Nematanthus kuhlmannii (Handro) Chautems
Nematanthus lanceolatus (Poir.) Chautems
Nematanthus maculatus (Fritsch) Wiehler
Nematanthus mattosianus (Handro) H.E.Moore
Nematanthus mirabilis (Handro) Chautems
Nematanthus monanthos (Vell.) Chautems
Nematanthus punctatus Chautems
Nematanthus pycnophyllus Chautems, T.Lopes & M.Peixoto
Nematanthus sericeus (Hanst.) Chautems
Nematanthus serpens (Vell.) Chautems
Nematanthus striatus (Handro) Chautems
Nematanthus strigillosus (Mart.) H.E.Moore
Nematanthus teixeiranus (Handro) Chautems
Nematanthus tessmannii (Hoehne) Chautems
Nematanthus villosus (Hanst.) Wiehler
Nematanthus wettsteinii (Fritsch) H.E.Moore
Nematanthus wiehleri Chautems & M.Peixoto

Cultivation 
They may lose their leaves if temperatures go above this level. Nematanthus do best in bright indirect light, and can easily burn in direct sunlight. They prefer high humidity, and grow better under these conditions, but adapt to household humidity. The tuberous roots of this plant retain water, and Nematanthus prefer the soil to remain moist, and well-drained. The goldfish plant enjoys being pot-bound, and is more likely to bloom in that state. When grown in the right conditions, Nematanthus is known to bloom year-round. To encourage new blooms, regular pruning of the plant is recommended. Plants can be propagated from cuttings.

Cultivars

'Tropicana' originated from a cross made in the United States by W. R. Saylor. The parents were reported to be N. perianthomegus and N. gregarius. , N. perianthomegus was treated as a synonym of N. hirtellus by Plants of the World Online, although other sources say that it is a synonym of N. tessmannii. 'Tropicana' is initially upright, after which older branches trail. The flower has a red-brown calyx, the fused petals (perianth) being yellow with red-brown stripes and spots. 'Tropicana' produces flower buds all year round.

'Rio' also originated from a cross by Saylor, in this case between N. gregarius and N. fissus (syn. Hypocyrta selloana). Its leaves are slightly larger than those of 'Tropicana', lighter green on both sides and less glossy. The flower is smaller, with a light green calyx and a striking orange-red perianth. 'Rio' makes buds all year round.

'Herens' is of unknown origin. It resembles 'Tropicana', with a somewhat smaller leaf, with a reddish tinge on the underside. The calyx is red-green and the perianth orange-red. It can flower abundantly all year round.

'Gietvoz' is also of unknown origin. It is a compact cultivar, less sensitive to unfavorable growing conditions such as overwatering or bright light. The leaf is smaller, and less tapered than that of other cultivars, and is thick, waxy and glossy. The underside of the leaf is red with a green edge and is clearly visible as the leaves are somewhat upright. The flower has an inconspicuous light green calyx and an orange-yellow perianth. Although 'Gietvoz' does not flower as readily as other cultivars, it has a good growth habit and attractive foliage.

Saylor also made crosses between Codonanthe gracilis and Nematanthus hybrids, creating the hybrid genus × Codonatanthus. Two of the resulting cultivars are 'Fiesta' and 'Aurora'.

Nematanthus gregarius 'Dibley's Gold' has variegated leaves.

Toxicity 
Nematanthus is considered non-toxic and safe for pets by the ASPCA.

References

External links
 Nematanthus, Codonanthe and Related Intergenerics, from the Gesneriad Reference Web

Gesnerioideae
Epiphytes
Gesneriaceae genera